Priyanka is a 2016 Indian Kannada language thriller film written and directed by Dinesh Babu and produced by A. Mohan. Based on a real-life incident occurred in Bengaluru, the film stars Priyanka Upendra and Tejas in the lead roles. Prakash Raj plays a special role of an investigator in the film. The music is composed by Krupakar and cinematography is by the director, Babu.

Filming began in the November month of 2014 and took a single stretch of 32 days to complete. However, the film could not release for a long time. After multiple announcements of the release dates, the film released on 5 February 2016.

Cast
 Priyanka Upendra as Priyanka
 Tejas as Ashwath Rayappa
 Prakash Raj as ACP Satya Nadig
 Shivadwaj as Priyanka's husband Siddanth aka Siddu
 Abhilash
 Avinash as Ashwath's father
 Sumithra
 Veena Sunder as ACP Malathi Hosamane
 Jayshree S. Raj

Production
Director Dinesh Babu announced the project soon after the release of his directorial Athi Aparoopa in 2014. Roping in actress Priyanka Upendra, he chose to keep the title name as Priyanka as he felt it would connect to the story. The film is said to be shot in an 8K resolution camera, capturing the real event incident that occurred in Bengaluru city. The director also gave a hint that the film would highlight both the pros and cons of the social networking sites such as Facebook, Twitter and Instagram.

Soundtrack

M. N. Krupakar composed the music for the film and the soundtracks, also writing the lyrics for soundtracks. The album has three soundtracks.

References

External links
 

2016 films
2010s Kannada-language films
Indian thriller films
Indian films based on actual events
Films directed by Dinesh Baboo
2016 thriller films
Thriller films based on actual events